Larrañaga may refer to:

Places

 Larrañaga, Uruguay, a barrio of Montevideo, Uruguay.

People

Carlos Larrañaga (1937–2012), Spanish actor
Catalina Larranaga, American actress
Cristóval María Larrañaga (1758–1851), one of the first trained physicians in New Mexico
Dámaso Antonio Larrañaga (1771–1848), Uruguayan priest, naturalist and botanist
Francisco Larrañaga (born 1913), Basque pelota player
Gorka González Larrañaga (born 1977), Spanish professional road bicycle racer.
Isabel Larrañaga Ramírez (1836–1899), Venerable in the Roman Catholic Church
Jay Larranaga, (born 1975), Irish-American professional basketball player
Jesús Larrañaga (1901–1942), Basque communist union leader 
Jim Larrañaga (born 1949), American college basketball coach 
Jorge Larrañaga (1956–2021), Uruguayan politician.
José de Larrañaga (1728–1806), Franciscan friar, organist, composer
Juan Antonio Larrañaga (born 1958), Spanish footballer 
Larry Larrañaga, (1937-2018), American civil engineer and politician
Carlos P. Larraňaga, (Larranaga), (1949-), born in Havana, Cuba Fashion and Leather Designer.

Other
Por Larrañaga, the name of two cigar brands

See also
Larrinaga, a surname

Basque-language surnames